Organ is the debut studio album by British drum n bass producer Dimension, released in March 2021. The album was a commercial success in New Zealand, reaching number six.

Production

Dimension decided to release a formal studio album, as he felt more self-assured as a musician, and to create a work that delves deeper into his musical sound. At the time of release, nine of the album's 17 tracks were released as singles.

Track listing

Charts

Weekly charts

Year-end charts

References

2021 debut albums
Drum and bass albums
Electronic dance music albums by English artists